Ashley Judd (born Ashley Tyler Ciminella; April 19, 1968) is an American actress. She grew up in a family of performing artists, the daughter of country music singer Naomi Judd and the half-sister of country music singer Wynonna Judd. Her acting career has spanned more than three decades, and she has become heavily involved in global humanitarian efforts and political activism.

Judd has starred in films that have been well received, and that have been box office successes, including Ruby in Paradise (1993), Heat (1995), Smoke (1995), Norma Jean & Marilyn (1996), A Time to Kill (1996), Kiss the Girls (1997), Double Jeopardy (1999), Where the Heart Is (2000), Frida (2002), High Crimes (2002), Divine Secrets of the Ya-Ya Sisterhood (2002), De-Lovely (2004), Twisted (2004), Bug (2006), Dolphin Tale (2011), Olympus Has Fallen (2013), Divergent (2014), Dolphin Tale 2 (2014), Big Stone Gap (2014), Barry (2016) and A Dog's Way Home (2019). She starred as Rebecca Winstone in the 2012 television series Missing, for which she was nominated for a Primetime Emmy Award for Outstanding Lead Actress in a Miniseries or a Movie.

Early life 
Judd was born in 1968 in Granada Hills, Los Angeles. Her parents are Naomi Judd, who later became a country music singer and motivational speaker, and Michael Charles Ciminella, a marketing analyst for the horse racing industry. Ashley's elder half-sister, Wynonna Judd, is also a country music singer.

Ashley's paternal grandfather was of Sicilian (Italian) descent, and her paternal grandmother was a distant descendant of Mayflower pilgrim William Brewster.

When Judd was born, her mother was still a housewife; she did not become well known as a singer until the early 1980s, after she had returned to Kentucky. Judd's parents divorced in 1972 when she was four. The following year, Judd's mother Naomi returned with Ashley to Kentucky, where Judd lived for most of her childhood.

Judd attended 13 schools before college, including the Sayre School (Lexington, Kentucky), Paul G. Blazer High School (Ashland, Kentucky), and Franklin High School in Tennessee. She briefly tried modeling in Japan during a school break. At the University of Kentucky, she majored in French and minored in anthropology, art history, theater, and women's studies. She joined the sorority Kappa Kappa Gamma. Judd spent a semester studying in France as part of her major. She graduated from the University of Kentucky Honors Program and was nominated to Phi Beta Kappa.

After college Judd drove across country to Hollywood, where she studied with acting teacher Robert Carnegie at Playhouse West. During this time, she worked as a hostess at The Ivy restaurant and lived in a Malibu rental house. Around that time, she returned East to Williamson County, Tennessee, where she lived near her mother and sister.

Career 

Starting in 1991, Judd appeared as Ensign Robin Lefler, a Starfleet officer, in two episodes of Star Trek: The Next Generation, "Darmok" and "The Game". From 1991 to 1994, she had a recurring role as Reed, the daughter of Alex (Swoosie Kurtz), on the NBC drama Sisters.

She made her feature film debut with a small role in 1992's Kuffs. In 1993, she was cast in her first starring role playing the title character in Victor Nuñez's Ruby in Paradise. This won the Sundance Film Festival Grand Jury Prize. Believing that this role would shape the rest of her career, Judd was extremely nervous before the audition, nearly getting into a car accident en route. "From the first three sentences, I knew it was written for me", she told the San Jose Mercury News. She received rave reviews in her role as Ruby Lee Gissing, a young woman trying to make a new life for herself. This performance would launch her career as an actress.

Nuñez told biographer James L. Dickerson that Judd created the resonance of this character: "The resonance, those moments, was not contrived. It was just a matter of creating the scene and trusting that it was worth telling."

Oliver Stone, who had seen Judd in Nuñez's film, cast her in Natural Born Killers. Her scenes were later cut from the version of the film released theatrically. The following year, she gained critical acclaim for her role as Harvey Keitel's estranged daughter in Wayne Wang's Smoke and as Val Kilmer's wife in Michael Mann's Heat. That same year she played the role of Callie in Philip Ridley's dark adult fairy tale The Passion of Darkly Noon.

In 1996, she co-starred with Mira Sorvino as Marilyn Monroe in Norma Jean and Marilyn, where she recreated the photo shoot for the centerfold for the first issue of Playboy. The same year she had a supporting role in the thriller film A Time to Kill. It received positive reviews and was a major box office success. By the end of the 1990s, Judd had achieved considerable success as a leading actress, having lead roles in additional thrillers that performed well at the box office, including Kiss the Girls (1997) and Double Jeopardy (1999).

In the early 2000s she starred in Where the Heart Is (2000), Someone Like You (2001), and High Crimes (2002). These were moderate box office successes. Her film Divine Secrets of the Ya-Ya Sisterhood (2002) performed well. In 2002 she starred in the critically acclaimed film Frida.

Judd played the role of Maggie the Cat in the 2003 Broadway revival of Tennessee Williams's Cat on a Hot Tin Roof.

In 2004 she received praise and a Golden Globe nomination for Best Actress, for her performance in De-Lovely, opposite Kevin Kline, who played Cole Porter. She also starred in Twisted (2004). This was widely panned.

In 2010, Judd was Janet Tamaro's original choice for the role of Detective Jane Rizzoli in the TV series Rizzoli & Isles but she declined. Angie Harmon took the role. In 2011, Judd co-starred with Patrick Dempsey in the film Flypaper. In 2012, she starred as Rebecca Winstone on the ABC series Missing. In 2014, she appeared as Natalie Prior in Divergent, which she reprised in the 2015 sequel Insurgent.

In 2014, Judd was the narrator of the documentary film about Turkish preacher Fethullah Gülen, Love is a Verb, directed by Terry Spencer Hesser. The following year she became the first woman to narrate the opening for the telecast of the Kentucky Derby.

Sponsorships

Starting in 2004, Judd was the advertising "face" of American Beauty, an Estée Lauder cosmetic brand sold at Kohl's department stores, and of H. Stern jewelers. In June 2007, Goody's Family Clothing launched three fashion clothing lines with Judd in the fall to be called "AJ", "Love Ashley", and "Ashley Judd". In 2008 they added an "Ashley Judd Plus" line.

Personal life 

In December 1999, Judd became engaged to Dario Franchitti, a Scottish racing driver who competed in Championship Auto Racing Teams (CART). They married in December 2001 at Skibo Castle in Scotland. They had no children together. Judd is an antinatalist: "It's unconscionable to breed with the number of children who are starving to death in impoverished countries." They divorced in 2013.

Judd is an avid martial arts practitioner: she enjoys kickboxing, judo, Brazilian jiu-jitsu, kung-fu, and taekwondo.

In February 2006, she entered a program at Shades of Hope Treatment Center in Buffalo Gap, Texas and stayed for 47 days. She was there for treatment of depression, insomnia, and codependency.

In 2011, Judd released her memoir All That is Bitter and Sweet, in which she discusses her life from adolescence to adulthood. She concentrates on her humanitarian work as an adult.

In February 2021, while hiking in the jungle in the Democratic Republic of the Congo, Judd shattered her leg. African porters transported her for 55 hours to reach a hospital for surgery in South Africa.

Judd is a Christian and cited her faith as why she went public against Weinstein.

Education
By May 2007, Judd completed a BA degree at the University of Kentucky. She was awarded an Honorary DHL degree from Union College in Barbourville, Kentucky, on May 9, 2009.

She returned to post-grad studies, earning a mid-career MPA degree from Harvard Kennedy School in 2010.

In August 2016, Judd enrolled at UC Berkeley to pursue a PhD in Public Policy at the Goldman School of Public Policy. She took a medical leave of absence two months later because she was suffering from siege migraines.

Interests
Judd follows sports at her alma mater, and has attended many University of Kentucky basketball games.

During the 2007 IndyCar season, Judd criticized allowing rookie Milka Duno to race. After the final race, Judd said to reporters "I know this is not very sportsmanlike, but they've got to get the 23 car (Duno) off the track. It's very dangerous. I'm tired of holding my tongue. She shouldn't be out there. When a car is 10 miles [an hour] off the pace, it's not appropriate to be racing. People's lives are at stake."

Sexual harassment and assault
In October 2015, Judd told Variety that she had been sexually harassed by a studio mogul but did not name the person. In October 2017, she said the person was Harvey Weinstein, co-founder of Miramax, and said that the sexual harassment occurred during the filming of Kiss the Girls.

On April 30, 2018, Judd filed a defamation and sexual harassment lawsuit against Weinstein, stating that he hurt her career by spreading lies about her after she rejected his sexual advances. Weinstein filed a motion to dismiss in July. In January 2019, a federal judge in California dismissed Judd's claim of sexual harassment against Weinstein but allowed Judd to pursue her defamation claim that Weinstein sabotaged her career.

At the Women in the World summit in April 2019, Judd addressed Georgia's six-week abortion ban, which had been passed in March 2019. She said that she had been raped three times, and became pregnant once. She said, "As everyone knows, and I'm very open about it, I'm a three-time rape survivor. One of the times that I was raped there was conception and I'm very thankful I was able to access safe and legal abortion. Because the rapist, who is a Kentuckian, as am I, and I reside in Tennessee, has paternity rights in Kentucky and Tennessee. I would've had to co-parent with my rapist."

Humanitarian work 
Judd has conducted humanitarian work that focuses on gender equality, and the sexual and reproductive health and rights of women and girls. In 2016, she was appointed a Goodwill Ambassador for UNFPA, the United Nations agency with responsibilities including sexual and reproductive health. As of May 2018, she had visited UNFPA's projects for women and girls affected by humanitarian crises in Jordan, Turkey, Ukraine, and Bangladesh, and its development work in India and Sri Lanka.

Judd has travelled with YouthAIDS to places affected by illness and poverty, such as Cambodia, Kenya, and Rwanda. She has become an advocate for preventing poverty and promoting awareness internationally. She has met with political and religious leaders on behalf of the deprived about political and social change. Judd has narrated three documentaries for YouthAIDS that aired on the Discovery Channel, in National Geographic, and on VH1.

In 2011, she joined the Leadership Council of the International Center for Research on Women. Other organizations Judd has been involved with include Women for Women International and Equality Now. She is a member of the advisory board for Apne Aap Women Worldwide, an organization fighting sex-trafficking and inter-generational prostitution in India.

Judd is active on the speakers' circuit, giving speeches about gender equality, abuse and humanitarian topics.

Other work 

Judd has supported the following charities and foundations:

 Apne Aap Women Worldwide
Children's Medical Research Institute
 Committee for Children
 Creative Coalition
DC Statehood
 Defenders of Wildlife
 Eracism Foundation
 Equality Now
 Five & Alive
 Jeans for Genes
 International Center for Research on Women (ICRW)
 Listen Campaign
 Malaria No More
 Population Services International
 SixDegrees.org
 UNFPA

Political activities 
In 2008, Judd supported Barack Obama's presidential campaign. In 2009, she appeared in a one-minute video advertisement for the Defenders of Wildlife Action Fund, in which Judd condemned Alaska Governor Sarah Palin for supporting aerial wolf hunting. In response, Palin stated the reason these wolves are killed is to protect the caribou population in Alaska. Palin called the Defenders of Wildlife Action Fund an "extreme fringe group". In 2010, Judd signed the Animal Legal Defense Fund's petition to urge Kentucky Governor Steve Beshear to protect that state's homeless animals through tough enforcement of Kentucky's Humane Shelter Law.

Judd is active in humanitarian and political causes. She was appointed Global Ambassador for YouthAIDS, an education and prevention program of the international NGO Population Services International (PSI), promoting AIDS prevention and treatment. Judd was honored November 10, 2009, as the recipient of the fourth annual USA Today Hollywood Hero, awarded for her work with PSI. On October 29, 2006, Judd appeared at a "Women for Ford" event for Democratic Tennessee Senate candidate Harold Ford Jr. She has also campaigned extensively both locally and nationally for a variety of Democratic candidates, including President Barack Obama in critical swing states.

On September 8, 2010, CNN interviewed Judd about her second humanitarian mission to the Democratic Republic of the Congo. Judd traveled with the Enough Project, a project to end genocide and crimes against humanity. In the interview, Judd discussed her efforts to raise awareness about how conflict minerals fuel sexual violence in Congo. During her trip, Judd visited hospitals for victims of sexual violence, camps for displaced persons, mines, and civil society organizations. On September 30, 2010, CNN published an op-ed titled "Ashley Judd: Electronics fuel unspeakable violence" by Judd and Enough Project co-founder John Prendergast regarding the continued violence in Congo.  On November 26, 2010, she published a subsequent op-ed, "Costs of Convenience", excerpted from her trip diary from eastern Congo. These pieces discussed the recent provision in the Dodd-Frank Reform bill that requires companies to prove where their minerals originated, and the link between modern electronics (which rely on those minerals) and mining camps plagued by such violence.

Judd represented Tennessee as a delegate to the 2012 Democratic National Convention. She also considered returning to Kentucky and challenging Senator Mitch McConnell in 2014. In response, the conservative Super PAC American Crossroads released an attack ad against Judd in Kentucky.

In February 2013, she invited her Twitter followers to join a mailing list, hinting that she might ultimately announce a run for the Senate to those on the list. However, she announced on March 27, 2013, that she would not run, citing her need to be focused on her family. Judd later endorsed Kentucky Secretary of State Alison Lundergan Grimes.

On July 26, 2016, Judd attended a Creative Coalition luncheon in support of DC Statehood that took place during the Democratic National Convention in Philadelphia. The event, hosted by Washington, DC Mayor Muriel Bowser and Del. Eleanor Holmes Norton, also included actors Elizabeth Banks, Tim Daly, Josh Gad, William Baldwin, and David Schwimmer.

Judd attended the 2017 Women's March. She performed a poem written by Nashville-area poet Nina Donovan, "Nasty Woman", to applause from the crowd.

In January 2020, Judd endorsed Democratic Senator Elizabeth Warren in her run for the presidency.

Filmography

Film

Television

Documentaries

Accolades

Awards and nominations

Honors 
 Kentucky Colonel
 Honorary Doctor of Humane Letters, Union College, Barbourville, Kentucky
 2017 Time Person of the Year, as part of the "Silence Breakers"

Notes

References

External links 

 
 
 
 
 
 
 
 
 
 Columns at The Guardian
 YouthAid's Ambassador Ashley Judd launches US-funded Newstart Voluntary Counseling and Testing Centre (VCT) for HIV/AIDS in Cape Town
 "Sarah Palin's Ongoing Wolf Slaughter" – Judd's video for Defenders of Wildlife 

1968 births
20th-century American actresses
21st-century American actresses
Activists from Los Angeles
Actresses from Los Angeles
Actresses from Kentucky
American feminists
American film actresses
American voice actresses
American female judoka
American people of English descent
American people of Italian descent
People of Sicilian descent
American female taekwondo practitioners
American wushu practitioners
American practitioners of Brazilian jiu-jitsu
American female kickboxers
American television actresses
Anti-natalists
Independent Spirit Award for Best Female Lead winners
Harvard Kennedy School alumni
Kentucky Democrats
Kentucky Wildcats basketball
Living people
Paul G. Blazer High School alumni
People from Ashland, Kentucky
People from Granada Hills, Los Angeles
Tennessee Democrats
Sayre School alumni
University of Kentucky alumni
Racing drivers' wives and girlfriends
Childfree